Switch on Bigga is a 1954 Australian documentary. It was directed by Lee Robinson, produced by Stanley Hawes and written by Mungo MacCallum.

It concerns electricity coming to the New South Wales town of Bigga. During filming it was known as Billy Sees the Light.

The movie screened in some cinemas.

References

External links
Complete film at National Film and Sound Archive YouTube Channel

Documentary films about energy
Energy in New South Wales
Australian documentary films